Ohsawa Dam  is a gravity dam located in Iwate Prefecture in Japan. The dam is used for power production. The catchment area of the dam is 17.3 km2. The dam impounds about 2  ha of land when full and can store 170 thousand cubic meters of water. The construction of the dam was started on 1939 and completed in 1943.

See also
List of dams in Japan

References

Dams in Iwate Prefecture